Dřetovice is a municipality and village in Kladno District in the Central Bohemian Region of the Czech Republic. It has about 500 inhabitants.

Geography
It lies in a flat agricultural landscape of the Prague Plateau. The Dřetovický Brook flows through the municipality. There are two ponds supplied by the brook.

History
The first written mention of Dřetovice is from 1233.

Transport
The D7 motorway from Prague to Chomutov runs through the municipality.

Sights
The landmark of Dřetovice is the Church of Saint Wenceslaus, located on a hill above the village. It is a Romanesque church with Gothic and Baroque modifications. It current appearance is from the mid-18th century, when the tower was added.

In the centre of the village is the Chapel of the Virgin Mary. It is a simple, late Baroque chapel.

References

External links

Villages in Kladno District